Bloomfield Municipal Airport  is a public use airport located two nautical miles (2.3 mi, 3.7 km) southwest of the central business district of Bloomfield, a city in Knox County, Nebraska, United States. It is owned by the Bloomfield Airport Authority.

Facilities and aircraft 
It has one runway designated 14/32 with an asphalt surface measuring 2,700 by 50 feet (823 x 15 m).

For the 12-month period ending August 4, 2010, the airport had 4,050 general aviation aircraft operations, an average of 11 per day. At that time there were five single-engine aircraft based at this airport.

References

External links 
 Bloomfield (84Y) at Nebraska Department of Aeronautics
 Aerial photo as of 31 March 1999 from USGS The National Map
 

Airports in Nebraska
Buildings and structures in Knox County, Nebraska